Live at the Hammersmith Odeon may refer to:

Live at Hammersmith Odeon (Kate Bush album)
Live at the Hammersmith Odeon (Nuclear Assault album)
Live at Hammersmith Odeon, by Black Sabbath
Live at the Hammersmith Odeon '81, by Stranglers
Live at the Odeon Hammersmith London, by Billy Connolly

See also
Live at Hammersmith (disambiguation)
Hammersmith Odeon London '75, by Bruce Springsteen
Hammersmith Apollo, the venue formerly known as the Hammersmith Odeon